Marie-Claire is a given name. It is a combination of the names Marie and Claire, which are both of French origin. It may refer to:

Marie-Claire Alain (1926–2013), organist and organ teacher
Marie-Claire Baldenweg (born 1954), contemporary artist
Marie-Claire Blais (1939–2021), author and playwright
Marie-Claire Cremers, better known as Amber (born 1970), Dutch-German singer-songwriter
Marie-Claire D'Ubaldo, singer
Marie-Claire Foblets, Belgian lawyer and anthropologist
Marie-Claire Houart, civil servant
Marie-Claire Heureuse Félicité (1758–1858), Empress of Haiti
Marie-Claire Kirkland (1924–2016), judge and politician
Marie-Claire Restoux (born 1968), judoka
Marie-Claire Schanne-Klein, French physicist
the nom de guerre of Mary Lindell, Comtesse de Milleville, a prominent resistance agent in Nazi-occupied France

See also 

Claire-Marie Le Guay
Marie Claire, a magazine
Mary-Claire King
María Clara (disambiguation)

French feminine given names
Compound given names